Shipwrights Way, so called because it traces in a fanciful way the route that might have been taken by timber  from forest to warship, is a 50-mile long-distance footpath through Hampshire, England from Alice Holt Forest to 
Portsmouth: it passes through Bordon, Liphook, Liss, Petersfield, Queen Elizabeth Country Park, Staunton Country Park, Havant and Hayling Island en route.

References 

Footpaths in Hampshire
Shipbuilding in England